Sankouissi is the name of two villages in Burkina Faso:

 Sankouissi, Toece, Bazèga Province
 Sankouissi, Gounghin, Kouritenga Province